Karan Trivedi (born 17 January 1984) is an Indian television and theatre artist who speaks Hindi and Gujarati. He is the younger brother of actress, Ami Trivedi.

Filmography
Films 

TV

Dubbing career
He has been performing Hindi and Gujarati dubbing roles for local Indian and foreign cartoons for over a decade. In the theatrical films genre, he's best known for being the second and longest performing Hindi dub-over voice artist for Daniel Radcliffe's role as Harry Potter, in the Harry Potter films, from the second film until after the fifth film. He obtained the role to Hindi dub Harry Potter, after his sister Ami passed the role to him, after the first film's release in India. Fans consider that the Hindi dubbing role of Harry Potter throughout the second through fifth films, is arguably his best known dubbing role in his career to date.

He has performed the Hindi voice dub-over Harry Potter on four of the Harry Potter films, along with his colleagues, Rajshree Nath (Later replaced by Parignya Pandya in the third film and onwards), Nachiket Dighe, Prasad Barve, Saumya Daan, Rishabh Shukla, Dilip Sinha, Anil Datt, Vikrant Chaturvedi and Ali Khan, who voices Hermione Granger, Ronald Weasley, Draco Malfoy (Prasad for the second movie, with two other actors voicing Draco for the first film and the rest of the series respectively) Fred and George Weasley, Voldemort, Hagrid, Arthur Weasley (Dutt for all films starting with the second), Dumbledore (Dutt for the first 2 films and Chaturvedi from 5th to the final) and Severus Snape respectively, for the Hindi dubs of the film series.

He was considered to be known as: "The voice of Harry Potter".

But after the fifth film, another Hindi voice actor, Rajesh Kava, took over as the third and permanent voice for Harry Potter for the last three films.

He also gave the Hindi dubbing voice to Zac Efron's role as Troy Bolton in the High School Musical film series.

Dubbing roles

Animated series

Live action television series

Live action films

Animated films

See also
Ami Trivedi - Karan's older sister, who's also in the acting and voice-artist business.

References

External links
 

Male actors from Mumbai
Indian male voice actors
Indian male child actors
Male actors in Hindi cinema
Gujarati people
Living people
1984 births
21st-century Indian male actors